In Greek mythology, Mecon (in Ancient Greek , Mḗkо̄n, meaning "poppy") was a beautiful young Athenian man, loved by the goddess Demeter.

Mythology 
The handsome Mecon became the lover of the agricultural goddess Demeter. He was transformed into a poppy flower at some point for his own preservation. Demeter was greatly associated with poppies, the flower seen as one of her symbols.

See also 
 Smilax
 Hyacinthus
 Crocus
 Clytie

Notes

References 
 Maurus Servius Honoratus. In Vergilii carmina comentarii. Servii Grammatici qui feruntur in Vergilii carmina commentarii; recensuerunt Georgius Thilo et Hermannus Hagen. Georgius Thilo. Leipzig. B. G. Teubner. 1881.
 William Smith. A Dictionary of Greek and Roman biography and mythology. London. John Murray: printed by Spottiswoode and Co., New-Street Square and Parliament Street.

External links 
 PLANT AND FLOWER MYTHS from The Theoi Project

Metamorphoses into flowers in Greek mythology
Attic mythology
Attican characters in Greek mythology
Consorts of Demeter